The Kokushikan Rhinoceros football program represents the Kokushikan University in college football. They are members of the Big 8 in the Kantoh Collegiate American Football Association.

References

External links
 

American football in Japan